The 2012–13 Copa Catalunya is the 24th staging of the Copa Catalunya. The competition began on 2 June 2012.

Tournament

First phase

First round

Second round

AEM and Olympia II received a bye.

Third round

Second phase

First round

Vic received a bye.

Second round

Third round

L'Hospitalet received a bye.

Fourth round

Semifinals

Final phase

Semifinals

Final

External links
Federació Catalana de Futbol 

Cata
Copa Catalunya seasons
Copa